Ann "Nancy" Wyse Power (16 November 1889 – 27 December 1963), was an Irish celticist, diplomat and nationalist.

Early life and education
She was born Ann Wyse Power in Dublin, 16 November 1889, to John Wyse Power and Jane O'Toole. Her father was a civil servant and one of the founding members of the Gaelic Athletic Association while her mother was an Irish activist, feminist, politician and businesswoman. Her family ran a restaurant in Henry Street and leading Irish nationalists were regular visitors. Her sister, Máire, was also a Celtic scholar.

Wyse Power joined the Gaelic League in 1902 and was on the Women's committee of Sinn Féin. She went to University College Dublin (UCD) where she graduated with a degree in 1912 in Celtic Studies. She followed the bachelor's degree with a doctorate in the University of Bonn, Germany. But in 1915 she was forced to return to Ireland because of the First World War. It took until 1920 before she was able to finish, studying under Julius Pokorny. She had specialised in Celtic Philology.

Activism and career
When in Ireland in 1915 Wyse Power joined Cumann na mBan. She was active in the week leading up to the Easter Rising and knew that the rising was due to go ahead. Bulmer Hobson asked her to be a courier and she carried messages including to Terence MacSwiney in Cork and to Carlow on Easter Monday. She worked out of the General Post Office, Dublin during Easter week carrying messages and moving provisions.

In 1917, she, with her mother, worked to provide relief for families who lost members or had members in prison. Late in 1917 she was appointed one of the secretaries of Cumann na nBan and helped to rebuild the organisation to over 500 branches by 1920. One of the events she was involved in was Lá na mBan, 9 June 1918. She was also recommended by Constance Markievicz to substitute for her if the leadership of Sinn Féin was arrested. Wyse Power was active throughout the Irish war of Independence.

Wyse Power was recruited by the new Dáil's foreign service to work with their German affairs. In April 1921 she set up the offices of the Irish mission in Berlin where she was also involved in restarting the Irish Bulletin. John Chartres was later leader of the political office, Charles Bewley was leader of the trade mission in Berlin and he suggested both Wyse Power and Chartres had anti-treaty sympathies and had both of them recalled.  However, since Wyse Power was not anti-treating she then joined Department of Industry and Commerce. She worked there from 1923 to 1932 when Seán T. O'Kelly requested her to work in the Department of Local Government and Public Health as his personal private secretary. As one of the first women to get to the position of principal officer in the civil service Wyse Power acted as an advocate for women.

She also worked as a governor of the Dublin Institute for Advanced Studies, a position to which she was appointed in 1940. Wyse Power retired from the civil service in 1954. She was president of the UCD Women Graduates' Association from 1959-62. She died on 27 December 1963, aged 74.

References and sources

1889 births
1963 deaths
People of the Irish Civil War (Pro-Treaty side)
People of the Easter Rising
Women in war in Ireland
Cumann na mBan members
Civil servants from Dublin (city)